The 1876 United States presidential election in Virginia took place on November 7, 1876, as part of the 1876 United States presidential election. Voters chose 11 representatives, or electors to the Electoral College, who voted for president and vice president.

Virginia voted for the Democratic candidate, New York Governor Samuel J. Tilden over the Republican candidate, Ohio Governor Rutherford B. Hayes. Tilden won Virginia by a margin of 19.15%.

Results

References

Virginia
1876
1876 Virginia elections